KMMJ (750 AM) is a radio station broadcasting a Spanish Christian contemporary format. Licensed to Grand Island, Nebraska, United States, the station serves the Grand Island, Hastings, Kearney area.  The station is currently owned by My Bridge Radio. Prior to the switch to religious programming, the station broadcast a news/information format.

The station was founded in 1925 in Clay Center, Nebraska, by the M.M. Johnson Co., a manufacturer of incubators. The station was purchased and moved to Grand Island in 1938.

Gallery

References

External links

 FCC History Cards for KMMJ
 "Big-Time Radio in Clay Center" -- NET Nebraska "Nebraska Stories" video on KMMJ's history in Clay Center

MMJ
Moody Radio affiliate stations
MMJ